Maple Valley High School may refer to:

 Maple Valley High School (Washington), Maple Valley, Washington
 Maple Valley High School (North Dakota), Tower City, North Dakota
 Maple Valley High School (Michigan), Vermontville, Michigan
 Maple Valley-Anthon Oto High School, Mapleton, Iowa